The tenth season of Australian Survivor, also known as Australian Survivor: Heroes V Villains, is an Australian television series based on the international reality game show franchise Survivor, which commenced airing on 30 January 2023. In this season, based on the twentieth American series and carrying the same sub-title, new and returning players were divided into two tribes of Heroes and Villains.

The season was filmed in Upolu, Samoa, marking the third time Australian Survivor had filmed there (the first being in 2016 and the second being in 2017).

Contestants 

The 24 contestants, which consist of 13 new contestants and 11 returnees from previous seasons, were divided into two tribes Heroes and Villains. The new contestants were divided based on how they see themselves playing the game, while the returnees were divided based on their previous style of game play.

Season summary 
The 24 contestants, new and returnees, were divided into two tribes of 12, the new contestants based on how they want to play the game, while the returnees based on their previous style of gameplay. 

Notes

Episodes

Voting history 
Tribal Phase (Day 1–27)

Individual phase (Day 28–47)

Notes

Reception

Ratings 
Ratings data is from OzTAM and represents the viewership from the 5 largest Australian metropolitan centres (Sydney, Melbourne, Brisbane, Adelaide and Perth).

References

External links 
 

Australian Survivor seasons
Television shows filmed in Samoa
2023 Australian television seasons